The 1976 Piccadilly World Match Play Championship was the 13th World Match Play Championship. It was played from Thursday 7 to Saturday 9 October on the West Course at Wentworth. Eight players competed in a straight knock-out competition, with each match contested over 36 holes. There was a large increase in the prize money with the champion receiving £25,000 compared to £10,000 the previous year. In the final, David Graham beat defending champion Hale Irwin after 38 holes.

For the first time there was a play-off between the losing semi-finalists for third place. It was played over 36 holes and was won by Gary Player.

This was the last World Match Play Championship sponsored under the Piccadilly name.

Course
Source:

Scores
Source:

Prize money
The winner received £25,000, the runner-up £15,000, third place £8,500, fourth place £6,500 and the first round losers £5,000, making a total prize fund of £75,000.

References

Volvo World Match Play Championship
Golf tournaments in England
Piccadilly World Match Play Championship
Piccadilly World Match Play Championship
Piccadilly World Match Play Championship